Felicia Abban (born 1935) was Ghana's first female professional photographer. She worked as a photographer for Ghana's first president, Kwame Nkrumah, for many years during the 1960s.

Early life 
Felicia Abban was born in 1935 in the Western Region of Ghana and grew up in a seaside town named Sekondi-Takoradi. She was the eldest of six children and quickly followed her father's, J.E. Ansah, footsteps in photography and became his apprentice at the age of 14. 

Abban studied under him for the next four years working on her craft and at the age of 18, Felicia relocated from Takoradi to Accra, where she set up her own studio.  In a few months she opened up her business, “Mrs. Felicia Abban’s Day and Night Quality Art Studio” in the center of Jamestown, Accra in 1955.

Felicia's husband, Robert Abban, designed the fabric with Kwame Nkrumah's portrait on flowers with a map of Ghana for the country's independence celebrations in 1957. Abban's studio was also close to other studios including J.K. Bruce Vanderpuije's “Deo Gratias” and James Barnor's “Ever Young Studio”. They also contributed to the history of Ghanaian photographers during this time period. This was still before Ghana's independence and “Deo Gratias is the oldest photography studio still in operation in Accra. It was established by Tamakloe’s grandfather James Koblah Bruce-Vanderpuije in 1922, it earned a reputation for documenting key events in the country’s history. James Barnor’s photography studio in the early 1950s and captured intimate moments of luminaries and key political figures, including Ghana’s first prime minister, Kwame Nkrumah as he pushed for pan-African unity and independence from colonial rule. In Abban’s early career she also worked for the Guinea Press Limited, now known as The Ghana Times, which was also the publishing house of Kwame Nkrumah’s Conventions People’s Party when he became president.

Photography career 
Spanning 50 years, her photography career began when she learnt photography from her father, and became his only female apprentice at the time. Felicia Abban is Ghana’s first female photographer. She, however, went on to become one of the continent’s most respected photo artists of her day – on the payroll of Kwame Nkrumah and a detailed analyst of her country’s transformation.   She is widely known for her self-portraits, especially the ones she took before an event as a way to promote her business from the 1950s to 1970s. Abban established her studio in Accra in 1955 and took on other women as apprentices. She was then recognized as one of Ghana's earliest instrumental female photographers projecting the contemporary African narrative through the lens.

During the early independence, her portraits also used clothing as the main expression of her identity and were used as “calling cards” around her own muses. Her self-portraits resembled fashion magazine images with an added more contemporary context. What is consistent throughout these diverse photographs is the way in which Abban used clothing to visibly articulate a feminine identity that played with the traditional and contemporary in an artful hybridity described as urbane and trans-Atlantic.

The first public display of her work was curated by Nana Oforiatta Ayim and staged at ANO's gallery in March 2017 and the gallery has plans of transforming her studio into a museum in her honour. The museum, when completed, will help preserve her work further serving as a hub to support upcoming artists. Nana Oforiatta Ayim also curated Ghana Freedom the first Ghanaian Pavilion at the Venice Biennale in 2019, which included Felicia Abban among the six artists chosen. Abban's portraits and self-portraits rendered a moment in Ghanaian history through her own female gaze that captured not only their style but also attitude during its time. 

Felicia Abban's work has also been showcased in the 12th edition of the 2019 Bamako Encounters. Abban's private photo collection consists of self portraits before she attended events. She retired from photography as a result of a worsening arthritis condition.

Family life 
Felicia was married to Robert Abban, the man who designed the fabric to commemorate Ghana's independence celebration in 1957 with Kwame Nkrumah's portrait featured on flowers with the Ghana map. Mr Abban was the creative director of former Ghana Textiles and Manufacturing Company (GTMC). She played a role in mentoring seminal filmmaker Kwaw Ansah, as well as the fashion designer Kofi Ansah both of whom are one of her siblings.

References 

Living people
Ghanaian photographers
Ghanaian women photographers
Ghanaian art historians
1935 births
20th-century Ghanaian businesswomen
20th-century Ghanaian businesspeople
People from Western Region (Ghana)